The 1987 European Competition for Women's Football took place in Norway. It was won by the hosts in a final against defending champions Sweden. Once again, the competition began with four qualifying groups, but this time a host nation was selected for the semi-final stage onwards after the four semi-finalists were identified.

Qualification

Squads
For a list of all squads that played in the final tournament, see 1987 European Competition for Women's Football squads

Bracket

Semifinals

Third place playoff

Final

Awards

Goalscorers
3 goals
  Trude Stendal

2 goals
  Gunilla Axén
  Kerry Davis

1 goal

  Jackie Sherrard
  Carolina Morace
  Elisabetta Vignotto
  Heidi Støre
  Anette Börjesson
  Lena Videkull

References

External links
Results at UEFA.com

Women
1987
1987
UEFA
European Competition for Women's Football
European Competition for Women's Football
European Competition for Women's Football
European Competition for Women's Football
European Competition for Women's Football
International sports competitions in Oslo
1980s in Oslo
Sport in Drammen
Sport in Moss, Norway